Pedicia auripennis is a species of hairy-eyed crane fly in the family Pediciidae.

Subspecies
These four subspecies belong to the species Pedicia auripennis:
 Pedicia auripennis anttenuata Alexander, 1941
 Pedicia auripennis auripennis Osten Sacken, 1859
 Pedicia auripennis breviclava Alexander, 1941
 Pedicia auripennis nephophila Alexander, 1941

References

Pediciidae
Articles created by Qbugbot
Insects described in 1859